Pyrausta tenuilinea is a moth in the family Crambidae. It was described by George Hampson in 1913 and it is found in Panama.

The wingspan is about 14 mm. The forewings are purplish pink with a yellowish antemedial line. The hindwings are whitish suffused with brown and a black terminal line.

References

Moths described in 1913
tenuilinea
Moths of Central America